Patrick Bos (born 20 August 1987) is a Dutch cyclist who rides as a sighted pilot for blind or partially sighted athletes in tandem track and road events. He competed at the 2012, 2016 and 2020 Paralympic Games, having won three medals.

Career
Along with Rinne Oost, Bos won the bronze medal in the men's 1 km time trial B event. At the 2019 UCI Para-cycling Track World Championships held in Apeldoorn, Netherlands, Tristan Bangma and Bos won the bronze medal in the men's time trial B event. Along with Stephen de Vries, Bos won the bronze medal at the 2016 Summer Paralympics.

References

1987 births
Living people
Sportspeople from Amstelveen
Dutch male cyclists
Cyclists at the 2012 Summer Paralympics
Cyclists at the 2016 Summer Paralympics
Cyclists at the 2020 Summer Paralympics
Medalists at the 2012 Summer Paralympics
Medalists at the 2016 Summer Paralympics
Medalists at the 2020 Summer Paralympics
Paralympic gold medalists for the Netherlands
Paralympic bronze medalists for the Netherlands
Paralympic medalists in cycling
Paralympic cyclists of the Netherlands
Cyclists from North Holland
21st-century Dutch people